Kotchandpur is an upazila of Jhenaidah District in the Division of Khulna, Bangladesh.

Geography
It has a total area of 165.66 km2. It is located in the south-west part of Bangladesh. It is under Jhenaidah district. Our Kotchandpur is surrounded by three upzilla, in the east "Kaliganj", in the south-west "Moheshpur" and in the north "Jhenaidah" sadar. There are two rivers cross Kotchandpur. One is the Kopothakho River (also called Kobadak, Kabadak, and Kapotaksma), which crosses the town and another is the Chitra, which forms the northern border of Kotchandpur. This city is very close to India. Once it was famous for sugar. It is also famous for Boluhor Fish Project.

Demographics

According to the 2011 Bangladesh census, Kotchandpur Upazila had 34,249 households and a population of 141,121, 23.5% of whom lived in urban areas. 8.9% of the population was under the age of 5. The literacy rate (age 7 and over) was 50.4%, compared to the national average of 51.8%.

Administration
Kotchandpur Upazila is divided into Kotchandpur Municipality and five union parishads: Baluhar, Dora, Elangi, Kushna, and Sabdalpur. The union parishads are subdivided into 81 mauzas and 79 villages.

Kotchandpur Municipality is subdivided into 9 wards and 25 mahallas.

Politics
Municipality Mayor: Md. Zahidul Islam (ZIRA) is the current Mayor of the Municipality (Pourasava). He was elected in the year 2016 and serving his 3rd term.

Upazila Chairman: Md. Tazul Islam. He was in politics for 20 years, under the banner of the opposition party Bangladesh Jamaat-e-Islami (2014–still now).

Upazila Vice Chairman: Md. Muabia Hossain. He was in politics for 25 years, under the banner of the opposition party Bangladesh Jamaat-e-Islami (2014–still now).

Upazila Mohila Vice Chairman: Mst. Nazma Khatun. She was in politics for 10 years, under the banner of the opposition party Bangladesh Jamaat-e-Islami (2014–still now).

Member of the Parliament (MP): Shafiqul Azam Khan

Education

There are six colleges in the upazila. They include Government K. M. H. College, founded in 1969, Kotchandpur Poura Mohila College, G. T. College Talsar, and S. D. Degree College.

The madrasa education system includes one kamil madrasa.

References

Upazilas of Jhenaidah District